Lincoln County is a county in the U.S. state of Minnesota. As of the 2020 census, the population was 5,640. Its county seat is Ivanhoe.

History
During and after the American Civil War, the Minnesota legislature wanted to name a county after President Abraham Lincoln. Acts were proposed to effect this change in 1861, in 1866, and in 1870, but each time the effort failed by vote or was ignored by the county's citizens. The final effort was an act passed on March 6, 1873, dividing Lyon County into approximately equal halves, with the western half to be named Lincoln. The county voters approved this act in the November 1873 election, and Governor Horace Austin proclaimed the county's existence on December 5, 1873, with Lake Benton as county seat. In 1900 a new town closer to the county's center was platted, and in 1902 the county seat was moved to that settlement, Ivanhoe.

Geography
Lincoln County lies on Minnesota's border with South Dakota. The Lac qui Parle River flows northeast through the upper eastern part of the county on its way to discharge into the Minnesota River. The county's terrain consists of rolling hills and is mostly devoted to agriculture. The terrain slopes to the north and east, with its highest point on its lower west border, at 1,991' (607m) ASL.

Lakes

 Ash Lake
 Curtis Lake
 Dead Coon Lake
 Drietz Lake
 Gislason Lake
 Hawks Nest Lake
 Lake Benton
 Lake Hendricks (part)
 Lake Shaokatan
 Lake Stay
 Oak Lake
 Perch Lake
 Steep Bank Lake
 Twin Lakes
 West Lake Stay

Major highways

  U.S. Highway 14
  U.S. Highway 75
  Minnesota State Highway 19
  Minnesota State Highway 23
  Minnesota State Highway 68
  Minnesota State Highway 271

Adjacent counties

 Deuel County, South Dakota - northwest
 Yellow Medicine County - north
 Lyon County - east
 Pipestone County - south
 Moody County, South Dakota - southwest
 Brookings County, South Dakota - west

Protected areas

 Altona State Wildlife Management Area (part)
 Ash Lake State Wildlife Management Area
 Blue Wing State Wildlife Management Area
 Bohemian State Wildlife Management Area (part)
 Chen-Bay State Wildlife Management Area
 Christine State Wildlife Management Area
 Collinson State Wildlife Management Area
 Dorer State Wildlife Management Area
 Emerald State Wildlife Management Area
 Expectation State Wildlife Management Area
 Hendricks State Wildlife Management Area
 Hole in the Mountain County Park
 Hope State Wildlife Management Area (part)
 Iron Horse State Wildlife Management Area
 Ivanhoe State Wildlife Management Area
 Johnson State Wildlife Management Area
 Kvermo State Wildlife Management Area
 Minn-Kota State Wildlife Management Area
 Northern Tallgrass Prairie National Wildlife Refuge
 Platyrhynchos State Wildlife Management Area
 Poposki State Wildlife Management Area
 Prairie Dell State Wildlife Management Area
 Shaokatan State Wildlife Management Area
 Sioux Lookout State Wildlife Management Area
 Sokota State Wildlife Management Area (part)
 Suhr State Wildlife Management Area
 Two Sloughs State Wildlife Management Area

Demographics

2000 census
As of the 2000 census, there were 6,429 people, 2,653 households, and 1,785 families in the county. The population density was 12.0/sqmi (4.62/km2). There were 3,043 housing units at an average density of 5.67/sqmi (2.19/km2). The racial makeup of the county was 98.82% White, 0.05% Black or African American, 0.28% Native American, 0.20% Asian, 0.42% from other races, and 0.23% from two or more races. 0.86% of the population were Hispanic or Latino of any race. 36.1% were of German, 25% English, 17.5% Norwegian, 10.9% Polish and 10.5% Danish ancestry.

There were 2,653 households, out of which 27.00% had children under the age of 18 living with them, 59.70% were married couples living together, 4.60% had a female householder with no husband present, and 32.70% were non-families. 30.50% of all households were made up of individuals, and 16.80% had someone living alone who was 65 years of age or older. The average household size was 2.35 and the average family size was 2.93.

The county population contained 23.70% under the age of 18, 6.10% from 18 to 24, 23.00% from 25 to 44, 22.70% from 45 to 64, and 24.50% who were 65 years of age or older. The median age was 43 years. For every 100 females there were 97.30 males. For every 100 females age 18 and over, there were 94.80 males.

The median income for a household in the county was $31,607, and the median income for a family was $38,605. Males had a median income of $26,494 versus $20,083 for females. The per capita income for the county was $16,009.  About 7.00% of families and 9.70% of the population were below the poverty line, including 9.60% of those under age 18 and 15.00% of those age 65 or over.

2020 Census

Communities

Cities

 Arco
 Hendricks
 Ivanhoe (county seat)
 Lake Benton
 Tyler

Unincorporated communities
 Marshfield
 Thompsonburg
 Verdi
 Wilno

Townships

 Alta Vista Township
 Ash Lake Township
 Diamond Lake Township
 Drammen Township
 Hansonville Township
 Hendricks Township
 Hope Township
 Lake Benton Township
 Lake Stay Township
 Limestone Township
 Marble Township
 Marshfield Township
 Royal Township
 Shaokatan Township
 Verdi Township

Government and politics
Lincoln County has been a swing district in recent decades. Up to 2016 it has selected the Democratic candidate in 56% of presidential elections since 1980. Like most white, rural counties in America, however, the GOP has made significant advances in the county recently.

See also
 National Register of Historic Places listings in Lincoln County, Minnesota

References

External links

 Lincoln County government's official website

 
Minnesota counties
1873 establishments in Minnesota
Populated places established in 1873